The Face in the Watch is a 1919 American short silent Western film directed by Edward A. Kull and featuring Hoot Gibson.

Cast
 Hoot Gibson
 Josephine Hill
 Harry Todd
 Duke R. Lee

See also
 List of American films of 1919
 Hoot Gibson filmography

External links
 

1919 films
1919 Western (genre) films
1919 short films
American silent short films
American black-and-white films
Films directed by Edward A. Kull
Silent American Western (genre) films
1910s American films